In a music sequencer and MIDI clock, pulses per quarter note (PPQN), also known as pulses per quarter (PPQ), and ticks per quarter note (TPQN), is the smallest unit of time used for sequencing note and automation events.

If the resolution is too low (too few PPQN), the performance recorded into the sequencer may sound artificial (being quantised by the pulse rate), losing all the subtle variations in timing that give the music a "human" feeling. Purposefully quantised music can have resolutions as low as 24 (the standard for Sync24 and MIDI, which allows triplets, and swinging by counting alternate numbers of clock ticks) or even 4 PPQN (which has only one clock pulse per 16th note).  At the other end of the spectrum, modern computer-based MIDI sequencers designed to capture more nuance may use 960 PPQN and beyond.

This resolution is a measure of time relative to tempo since the tempo defines the length of a quarter note and so the duration of each pulse. The resulting PPQN per MIDI-Clock is thus related to the TimeBase in Microseconds defined as 60.000.000 x MicroTempo = Beats per minute.

References

Further reading 
Information Retrieval for Music and Motion, Meinard Müller, Springer Science & Business Media, 09.09.2007 - 318 pages

External links 
 PPQN Timing Calculator
 Explanation on Sweetwater

MIDI